Nor Saiful Zaini Nasir-ud-Din (born 27 March 1966) is a Malaysian field hockey player. He competed at the 1992 Summer Olympics, the 1996 Summer Olympics and the 2000 Summer Olympics.

References

External links

1966 births
Living people
Malaysian male field hockey players
Olympic field hockey players of Malaysia
Field hockey players at the 1992 Summer Olympics
Field hockey players at the 1996 Summer Olympics
Field hockey players at the 2000 Summer Olympics
Place of birth missing (living people)
Commonwealth Games medallists in field hockey
Commonwealth Games silver medallists for Malaysia
Asian Games medalists in field hockey
Asian Games bronze medalists for Malaysia
Medalists at the 1990 Asian Games
Field hockey players at the 1990 Asian Games
Field hockey players at the 1998 Commonwealth Games
1998 Men's Hockey World Cup players
Medallists at the 1998 Commonwealth Games